Israel Baker (February 11, 1919 – December 25, 2011) was an American violinist and concertmaster. Through a long and varied career he played with many of the greatest figures in the worlds of classical music, jazz and pop.

He appeared on hundreds of recordings by artists as diverse as Igor Stravinsky, Ella Fitzgerald, and Tom Waits, and appeared on many film scores including Psycho and Jonathan Livingstone Seagull.  Baker was the concertmaster on The Dameans Beginning Today album from 1973.

Biography 
Born in Chicago, he was the youngest of four children of Russian immigrants. He showed great talent as a violinist from an early age, appearing on national radio at the age of six. By the age of 22 Baker was concertmaster of Leopold Stokowski’s All-American Youth Orchestra. Later he was a member of Arturo Toscanini’s NBC Symphony Orchestra. During World War II he served as a violinist with the Army Air Forces in Atlantic City, NJ, playing requests to entertain wounded comrades.

After the war Baker increasingly gravitated towards the West Coast and session work, including work with the famed "Wrecking Crew", although he continued to be a presence in concert halls across the United States. He formed a duo with pianist Yaltah Menuhin; they made their New York debut in 1951. In 1961 he played alongside violinist Jascha Heifetz and cellist Gregor Piatigorsky  in a series of chamber concerts, and in 1964 he recorded Arnold Schoenberg's "Fantasy for Violin & Piano" with Glenn Gould. He recorded many of Stravinsky's scores for CBS with Stravinsky himself conducting. He then went on to lead the Los Angeles Chamber Orchestra. Away from the concert hall he led the West Coast version of the CBS Symphony.

He died at his home in Studio City, California on December 25, 2011 following a stroke.

Personal life 
Baker was married twice: to Caroline, who died in 1974, and then to Imelda Corrigan from Dublin Ireland. They were married for over 30 years until his death. He had three children from his first marriage.

He is the grandfather to Vulfpeck bass player Joe Dart.

References

Tully Potter. "Israel Baker obituary." The Guardian, January 11, 2012.
Valerie J. Nelson. "‘Psycho’ violinist Israel Baker dies." Washington Post, January 9, 2012.
Valerie J. Nelson. "Israel Baker, renowned violinist, dies at 92." L.A. Times, January 9, 2012.

Barbara Zeisl Schoenberg. "Video Interview with Israel Baker", July, 2009.

American male violinists
American classical violinists
Male classical violinists
1919 births
2011 deaths
Musicians from Chicago
United States Army Air Forces personnel of World War II
Jazz musicians from California
American jazz violinists
20th-century classical violinists
Jazz musicians from Illinois
Classical musicians from California
Classical musicians from Illinois
20th-century American male musicians
American male jazz musicians
Concertmasters
20th-century American violinists